

Legislative Assembly elections
Legislative Assembly elections in India were conducted for Kerala Legislative Assembly in 1960.

Kerala

In 1959, the Central Government dismissed the democratically elected government in 1957 elections through the controversial Article 356 of the Indian Constitution following "The Liberation Struggle". After a short period of the President's rule, fresh elections were called in 1960. In these elections, Congress and Praja Socialist Party formed an alliance to counter Communist Party of India in the elections. Congress and Praja Socialist Party alliance got the majority in the election and hence formed the government.

See also
 1957 elections in India

References

External links

 Election Commission of India

1960 elections in India
India
1960 in India
Elections in India by year